Preserje pri Lukovici is a settlement south of Lukovica pri Domžalah in the eastern part of the Upper Carniola region of Slovenia.

Name
The name of the settlement was changed from Preserje to Preserje pri Lukovici in 1953.

References

External links

Preserje pri Lukovici on Geopedia

Populated places in the Municipality of Lukovica